Lozza is a comune (municipality) in the Province of Varese in the Italian region Lombardy, located about  northwest of Milan and about  southeast of Varese.

Lozza borders the following municipalities: Castiglione Olona, Gazzada Schianno, Malnate, Morazzone, Varese, Vedano Olona.

References

Cities and towns in Lombardy